The Queue de Castor River (English: “Beaver’s tail River”) is a tributary of Gabriel Lake, flowing into the Eeyou Istchee James Bay (Municipality), in Jamésie, in the administrative region of Nord-du-Québec, in Quebec, Canada.

This river successively crosses the townships of Beaucours, Feuquières and Robert. Forestry is the main economic activity of the sector; recreational tourism activities, second. A logging camp has been established on the west bank of Ventadour Lake near a forest road.

The South of “Queue de castor River” Valley is served by route 212 which connects Obedjiwan to La Tuque and passes south of Lake Dubois. From there, the forest road R1032 (North-South direction) passes on the strip of land between the head lakes of the “Queue de Castor River” and the Ventadour River.

The surface of the Beaver's Tail River is usually frozen from early November to mid-May, however Ice safety is usually from mid-November to mid-April.

Geography

Toponymy 
At various times in history, this territory has been occupied by the Attikameks, the Algonquins and the Crees. Formerly, this hydronym was designated "Beavertail River".

The toponym "Queue de Castor River" was formalized on December 5, 1968, at the Commission de toponymie du Quebec, when it was created.

Notes and references

See also 

Rivers of Nord-du-Québec
Nottaway River drainage basin
Jamésie